The Roy Petty Show also called Hora Legal con el Abogado Roy Petty is a Spanish language television and radio show which first aired in Texas, Oklahoma, Arkansas, and Mexico on TeleAmerica television in November 1999. The show was created by the Hispanic community leader Luis de la Garza to follow his Foro 44 program. The show moved to Univision in November 2002; and it changed to a radio format in May 2012 when it began airing on Univision America radio. It also is broadcast on KTNO radio Dallas. The program is hosted by Texas Immigration Attorney Roy Petty and since June 2010 has been cohosted by Univision television personality Reyna Cavasos.

Premise
This series is a lively and informative talk show which features Texas Immigration Lawyer Roy Petty who answers caller questions about legal matters, principally immigration and consumer advocacy. The show's "Scams Exposed!" segment has led to judgments and criminal prosecutions against con artists who have defrauded immigrants. In March 2005, the show exposed a multimillion-dollar document fraud scam orchestrated by an undocumented Mexican Fidelina Cuevas. In 2013, the Roy Petty Show exposed fraud which led to a civil fraud judgment against Mundo Latino of Dallas and Cecilia McDaniel. As a result of the investigation, Mundo Latino filed for bankruptcy and shut down.

In April 2006, the Show organised undocumented youths to march for passage of the DREAM Act and to demonstrate in front of the Earle Cabell Federal Building and Courthouse. In September 2008, Roy Petty won a court judgment overturning the prohibition on granting citizenship to immigrants with recent DWI convictions. In April 2012, the Show urged listeners to call the White House to demand work permits for undocumented youth as a response to the failed passage of the DREAM Act. On 15 June 2012, the Obama Administration announced the creation of DACA, formally called the Deferred Action for Childhood Arrivals program.

The Roy Petty Show broadcasts a weekly segment for victims of domestic violence and advises victims how to leave abusive relationships and how to obtain a U visa and legal status as the victim of crime.

References

External links
 

Telemundo original programming
Univision original programming
American talk radio programs